Group A of the 1996 Fed Cup Asia/Oceania Zone Group II was one of two pools in the Asia/Oceania Zone Group II of the 1996 Fed Cup. Four teams competed in a round robin competition, with the top two teams advancing to the play-offs.

New Zealand vs. Syria

New Zealand vs. Singapore

Singapore vs. Syria

See also
Fed Cup structure

References

External links
 Fed Cup website

1996 Fed Cup Asia/Oceania Zone